Robert Martin Osborne (c. 1852 – 22 September 1931) was a newspaper editor and proprietor of several newspapers in South Australia, notably the Petersburg Times in the town now known as Peterborough.

History
Robert was  born at Birdbush, Wiltshire, the son of Rev. Robert Ivey Osborne. He was apprenticed to a printer, and had experience in England, Scotland, Ireland and New York before emigrating to South Australia on the steamer "John Elder" in 1884.

He worked on David Drysdale's Port Augusta Dispatch, and ran a newspaper in Teetulpa before founding The Petersburg Times, Orroroo Chronicle and Northern Advertiser in 1887. He was active in the Petersburg community, for a time member of the town council, helping establish trees and in other ways improving the town. In 1896 his brother Samuel W. Osborne came out from England to assist him, and together they founded the Quorn Mercury and the Advertiser in Port Pirie, where he remained for many years.

In 1897 Robert left Petersburg to establish a printing business in Victoria Square, Adelaide, later moving to Currie Street. He founded The Farm for the S.A. Farmers' Co-operative Union, and The S.A. Freemason. He purchased The Garden and Field (edited by Alexis L. Holtze, son of M. W. Holtze), edited the Unley Citizen, and for a time ran The Critic. In 1909 R. M. Osborne sold the Times and Quorn Mercury to W. H. Bennett, previously an employee. The building, which was still owned by Osborne, was destroyed by fire 23 December 1909, at a great loss to Mr. Bennett.

Robert left for Launceston, where he served as Alderman, and was elected Mayor in 1929. He died in Sydney following a surgical operation.

Family
He married Laura Martha Axford, (c. 1861 – 16 April 1928) on 26 January 1887; their children included Mrs. L. F. Sutherland, of Sydney, and Miss Dorothy Osborne, of Launceston.

References 

Australian journalists
Australian newspaper proprietors
Australian newspaper editors
1852 births
1931 deaths
English emigrants to colonial Australia